Park Royal & Twyford Abbey was a London Underground station on the District Railway (now the District line), on a route now utilised by the Uxbridge branch of the Piccadilly line. It opened in 1903.

It was located near Twyford Abbey Road, a short distance north of the current Park Royal station which replaced it in 1931.

History
The station was opened on 23 June 1903 by the District Railway on a new branch line to South Harrow and Metropolitan line tracks at Rayners Lane.

Park Royal & Twyford Abbey was intended to serve the recently opened Royal Agricultural Society showgrounds at Park Royal; however, despite the proximity of the station (and another to the east on what is now the Central line), the showgrounds were not successful and closed after only a few years. The second part of the station's name was adopted from the nearby Twyford Abbey.

The station closed permanently on 5 July 1931 to be replaced the following day by a new Park Royal station built for the extension of Piccadilly line services to South Harrow. The new station is located approximately one-third of a mile to the south to provide access from the A40 (Western Avenue), constructed in the 1920s. Nothing of the Park Royal & Twyford Abbey station remains.

Unusually, whilst the site of station is on the route of the modern Piccadilly line, it was never served by Piccadilly line trains, as they did not begin to operate to South Harrow until July 1932, a year after the station closed.

References

Bibliography

External links
  Park Royal & Twyford Abbey station in 1908

Disused London Underground stations
Former Metropolitan District Railway stations
Railway stations in Great Britain opened in 1903
Railway stations in Great Britain closed in 1931
Park Royal